The 2008–09 Slovak 1.Liga season was the 16th season of the Slovak 1. Liga, the second level of ice hockey in Slovakia. 16 teams participated in the league, and HC Spisska Nova Ves won the championship.

Regular season

Pre-Playoffs 
 MHK Dolný Kubín – HK Dukla Michalovce 3:1 (5:0W, 4:2, 3:6, 2:1)
 HK VTJ Trebišov – HC 46 Bardejov 0:3 (1:2 n.V., 2:4, 2:3 n.V.)
 HC 07 Detva – HC Dukla Senica 1:3 (4:1, 1:2 n.P., 3:4 n.V., 0:9)
 HK Ružinov 99 Bratislava – MšHK Prievidza 1:3 (5:4 n.P., 1:2 n.P., 2:4, 1:4)

Playoffs

Quarterfinals 

HK Spišská Nová Ves – HC 46 Bardejov 3:0 (10:3, 6:1, 2:1p)

ŠHK 37 Piešťany – HC Dukla Senica 3:0 (2:1, 9:1, 5:0)

HK Trnava – MšHK Prievidza 3:0 (2:1, 4:2, 6:2)

HC 07 Prešov – MHK Dolný Kubín 3:0 (5:3, 1:0, 7:1)

Semifinals 

HK Spišská Nová Ves – HC 07 Prešov 3:1 (4:0, 3:1, 2:3p, 5:3)

ŠHK 37 Piešťany – HK Trnava 3:0 (4:0, 4:2, 5:1)

Final

HK Spišská Nová Ves – ŠHK 37 Piešťany 3:1 (1:3, 5:2, 2:1, 3:0)

External links
 Season on hockeyarchives.info

Slovak 1. Liga
Slovak 1. Liga seasons
Liga